Stewart Aircraft Corporation is an American aircraft manufacturer specializing in aircraft kits and plans. Don Stewart, a former airline pilot, designed several aircraft that are sold by the company. The company's first product, the Headwind, was one of the earliest examples of a homebuilt aircraft designed to use an air-cooled Volkswagen automotive engine with a patented gear reduction unit for the propeller.

Closure of business 
The Stewart Headwind Corporation website is down. The flywithstewart website states: "As of Dec. 2021 Don is no longer selling plans."

Aircraft

References

Aircraft manufacturers of the United States
Manufacturing companies based in Michigan
Manufacturing companies established in 1961
1961 establishments in Michigan